is a Japanese manga series by Masume Yoshimoto, serialized in Media Factory's seinen manga magazine Monthly Comic Flapper since May 2013. It has been collected in seventeen tankōbon volumes and is also available on Media Factory's ComicWalker web comic service. An anime television series adaptation by Kinema Citrus and EMT Squared aired from April 3, 2016 to June 19, 2016.

Plot
Machi Amayadori is the young shrine maiden who has spent her whole life in the rural mountains with Natsu, her talking guardian bear. Now, at fourteen, she wants to take a chance and attend high school in the big city. Can Natsu really prepare her for city life? Or will his wacky trials be too much for even Machi to bear?

Characters

The 14-year-old Miko of a mountain shrine in a remote village and is also a middle school student. She wants to move to the big city for high school because she finds life in the countryside boring, but has never left the village in her entire life, nor ever made a human friend around her age.

Natsu is a talking bear who has lived with Machi since she was a child and tries his best to deal with her antics and keep her out of trouble. He opposes Machi's idea of leaving the town, fearing for her safety.

Yoshio is Machi's 25 year old cousin who works as a village officer.

Etsuko is Machi's aunt and Yoshio's mother.

Fuchi is Etsuko's mother and Yoshio and Machi's grandmother. She lives with Machi and Natsu, but her face is never shown.

Hibiki is Yoshio's 24-year-old friend with a longtime crush on him, which she denies. She smokes and rides around on a motorcycle. She also displays an overly aggressive nature to hide her shyness.

Media

Manga
The manga series by Masume Yoshimoto began serialization in Monthly Comic Flapper magazine on April 5, 2013. The first tankōbon volume was released on October 23, 2013. The manga has been licensed by One Peace Books for a North American release.

Volume list

Anime
An anime television series adaptation by Kinema Citrus and EMT Squared aired from April 3, 2016 to June 19, 2016. Kadokawa, AT-X, Kinema Citrus and Sony Music Communications were involved in the production of the anime. Two OVAs are included in the first and second volume of the anime's home video release, which were released on June 24, 2016 and August 24, 2016, respectively.

Episode list

Reception
The series ranked 20th in the first Next Manga Award in the print manga category.

Notes

References

External links
 
 

EMT Squared
Seinen manga
Kinema Citrus
Media Factory manga
Comedy anime and manga
Anime series based on manga
Slice of life anime and manga
Shinto kami in anime and manga
Funimation
Shinto in fiction
Comics about bears
Animated television series about bears